Sands Fjord is a fjord in Peary Land, northern Greenland. To the north, the fjord opens into the Lincoln Sea of the Arctic Ocean. Administratively it belongs to the Northeast Greenland National Park.

The fjord was named by Robert Peary in honor of H. Hayden Sands, one of his sponsors and a member of the Peary Arctic Club.

Geography
The fjord is limited by Gertrud Rask Land on its western side.

Cape Hans Egede is the headland on the western side of the mouth of Sands Fjord. The MacMillan Glacier discharges at its head. Helvetia Tinde, the highest mountain of the Roosevelt Range, rises about  SSW of the head of the fjord.

See also
List of fjords of Greenland
Peary Land

References

External links
Crossing North Peary Land in Summer 1953
Fjords of Greenland
Peary Land